Musladin-Lueke syndrome (previously known as Chinese Beagle syndrome) is a hereditary disorder that affects beagles that manifests in extensive fibrosis of the skin and joints. It is named after beagle breeders Anton Musladin and Ada Leuke. It is caused by a number of recessive mutations affecting fibrillin-1, a major component of microfibrils. It affects several organ systems, including the skeleton, heart, skin, and muscle. According to the American Kennel Club's Canine Health Foundation, "beagles with Musladin-Leuke syndrome are born with several defects characterized by short outer toes on the front and sometimes all four feet, high set creased ears on a flat skull with extra cartilage in them, slant narrowed eyes, and very thick tight skin with little scruff." Affected dogs are usually smaller than average, and have a very stiff gait. Seizures have also been noted in affected dogs.

References 

Hereditary dog diseases